Berestove (also known as (German Birkenfeld) and (German Neu-Nikolaifeld)) is a village in Bakhmut Raion (district) in Donetsk Oblast of eastern Ukraine, about   east-northeast from the centre of Donetsk city.

The village was taken under control by Russian forces at the end of July 2022, during the Russian invasion of Ukraine. However, the general staff of Ukraine still reported Russian attacks on the village at the end of August 2022 and in March 2023.

References

Villages in Bakhmut Raion